is a Japanese football player.

Honours

Club
Phnom Penh Crown
Cambodian Premier League: 2021, 2022
Cambodian Super Cup: 2022
Cambodian League Cup: 2022

References

External links

1996 births
Living people
Association football people from Kanagawa Prefecture
Japanese footballers
J2 League players
FC Gifu players
Phnom Penh Crown FC players
Association football midfielders
Japanese expatriate footballers
Expatriate footballers in Poland
Expatriate footballers in Cambodia
Japanese expatriate sportspeople in Cambodia